Machadoia xanthosticta is a moth in the subfamily Arctiinae. It was described by George Hampson in 1901. It is found in Ecuador and the Brazilian state of Rio de Janeiro.

References

Moths described in 1935
Phaegopterina